Rat Patrol may refer to:
 The Rat Patrol, a television show
 A song by Naked Raygun on Throb Throb
 A song by They Might Be Giants on Long Tall Weekend
 A song by the Untouchables on Flex Your Head

See also 
 Combat Rock